The International Canoe Federation (ICF) is the umbrella organization of all national canoe organizations worldwide. It is headquartered in Lausanne, Switzerland, and administers all aspects of canoe sport worldwide. 157 countries are affiliated with the ICF after seven national federations were added at the 2008 ICF Congress in Rome.

In light of the 2022 Russian invasion of Ukraine, the ICF suspended athletes from Russia and Belarus from competing at any International Canoe Federation events, and suspended all officials from Russia and Belarus from officiating at any event sanctioned by ICF, and from attending or taking part in any ICF meetings, committees, and forums. In March 2023, the Russian Canoe Federation sent addressed the ISF, urging them to reverse the decision and allow Russian athletes to compete at ISF events. The RCF's statement included claims that the war was actually started by Ukraine and that "Russia defends peace".

Disciplines

Flatwater
Canoe sprint, formerly flatwater racing (World Championships since 1938)
ICF Canoe Sprint Junior World Championships from 1985 to 2011
ICF Canoe Sprint Junior & U23 World Championships from 2013 
ICF Masters Canoe Sprint World Championships
Canoe marathon, (World championships since 1988)
ICF Masters Canoe Marathon World Championships
ICF Canoe Marathon Masters World Cup
Dragon boat
Canoe polo (World Championships since 1994)
Paracanoe
 Va'a

Ocean
Canoe ocean racing (World Championships since 2013)
Canoe sailing 
 Waveski
 Surf ski - since 2010

Whitewater / Wildwater
Canoe slalom, formerly slalom racing (World championships since 1949)
Wildwater canoeing (World Championships since 1959)
Canoe freestyle (formerly called playboating and before rodeo) (World championships since 2007)

Flatwater and Ocean
 Standup paddleboarding (SUP)
ICF SUP World Championships from 2019

Executive board
Thomas Konietzko, President
Cecilia Farias, 1st Vice President
Aijie Liu, 2nd Vice President
Lluis Rabaneda Caselles 3rd Vice President
Luciano Buonfiglio, Treasurer

Membership

Continental associations
There are five continental associations affiliated with the ICF. These associations are responsible for organizing continental championships, providing support for their member federations and communicating their interests at the ICF Board meetings.

European Canoe Association
Pan American Canoe Federation
Oceania Canoe Association
Asian Canoe Confederation
African Canoe Confederation

National members

See also
American Whitewater 
Association of Summer Olympic International Federations
Canoe
Kayak
Paddle
Surf ski

References

External links

ICF 30 November 2008 article on the 2008 ICF Congress in Rome - accessed 30 November 2008.

 
Canoeing governing bodies
Canoe
Canoe